Yuka Tanaka (born 21 August 1974) is a Japanese former professional tennis player.

Tanaka competed on the professional tour in the 1990s, reaching a best singles ranking of 319. She featured in the main draw of the 1994 Nichirei International Championships, a WTA Tour tournament in Tokyo, then won an ITF title in Italy in 1995. As a doubles player, she was ranked as high as 159 in the world and appeared more regularly on the WTA Tour.

ITF Circuit finals

Singles: 2 (1–1)

Doubles: 15 (8–7)

References

External links
 
 

1974 births
Living people
Japanese female tennis players
20th-century Japanese women
21st-century Japanese women